The 1994 All-SEC football team consisted of American football players selected to the All-Southeastern Conference (SEC) chosen by various selectors for the 1994 college football season.

The Florida Gators won the conference title, beating the Alabama Crimson Tide 24 to 23 in the SEC Championship game. Alabama quarterback Jay Barker was voted SEC Player of the Year.

Offensive selections

Quarterbacks 

 Jay Barker, Alabama (AP-1, Coaches-1)
Eric Zeier, Georgia (AP-2)

Running backs 

 Stephen Davis, Auburn (AP-1, Coaches-1)
Sherman Williams, Alabama (AP-1, Coaches-1)
James Stewart, Tennessee (AP-2)
Jermaine Johnson, Vanderbilt (AP-2)

Wide receivers 
Jack Jackson, Florida (AP-1, Coaches-1)
Frank Sanders, Auburn (AP-1, Coaches-1)
Eric Moulds, Miss. St. (AP-2)
Brice Hunter, Georgia (AP-2)
Hasan Graham, Georgia (AP-2)

Centers 
Shannon Roubique, Auburn (AP-1, Coaches-1)
Bubba Miller, Tennessee (AP-2)

Guards 
Kevin Mays, Tennessee (AP-1, Coaches-1)
Jesse James, Miss. St. (AP-1, Coaches-1)
Jeff Smith, Tennessee (AP-2)
Steve Roberts, Georgia (AP-2)

Tackles
Willie Anderson, Auburn (AP-1, Coaches-1)
Jason Odom, Florida (AP-1, Coaches-1)
Jon Stevenson, Alabama (AP-2, Coaches-1)
Jason Layman, Tennessee (AP-2)

Tight ends 
 David LaFleur, LSU (AP-1, Coaches-1)
Andy Fuller, Auburn (AP-2)

Defensive selections

Ends
Kevin Carter, Florida (AP-1, Coaches-1)
Gabe Northern, LSU (AP-1, Coaches-1 [as LB])
Dameian Jeffries, Alabama (AP-2)
Stacy Evans, South Carolina (AP-2)

Tackles 
Ellis Johnson, Florida (AP-1, Coaches-1)
Mike Pelton, Auburn (AP-1, Coaches-1)
Shannon Brown, Alabama (AP-2)
Gary Walker, Auburn (AP-2)

Linebackers 
Abdul Jackson, Ole Miss (AP-1, Coaches-1)
Dwayne Curry, Miss. St. (AP-1, Coaches-1)
Ben Hanks, Florida (AP-2, Coaches-1)
Gerald Collins, Vanderbilt (AP-1)
Randall Godfrey, Georgia (AP-2)
Anthony Harris, Auburn (AP-2)
Ben Talley, Tennessee (AP-2)
Dexter Daniels, Florida (Coaches-2)

Cornerbacks 
Walt Harris, Miss. St. (AP-1, Coaches-1)
Larry Kennedy, Florida (AP-2, Coaches-1)
Alundis Brice, Ole Miss (AP-2, Coaches-1)
Tommy Johnson, Alabama (AP-1)

Safeties 
Brian Robinson, Auburn (AP-1, Coaches-1)
Willie Gaston, Alabama (AP-2, Coaches-1)
Melvin Johnson, Kentucky (AP-1)
Chris Shelling, Auburn (AP-2)
Tony Watkins, South Carolina (AP-2)
Sam Shade, Alabama (AP-2)
Jason Parker, Tennessee (AP-2)

Special teams

Kicker 
Judd Davis, Florida (AP-1, Coaches-2)
Michael Proctor, Alabama (AP-2, Coaches-1)

Punter 

 Terry Daniel, Auburn (AP-1, Coaches-1)
Shayne Edge, Florida (AP-2, Coaches-2)

Key
AP = Associated Press

Coaches = selected by the SEC coaches

Bold = Consensus first-team selection by both Coaches and AP

See also
1994 College Football All-America Team

References

All-SEC
All-SEC football teams